RJTV 23 (DXRS-TV) is a UHF, free to air television channel, owned and operated by Rajah Broadcasting Network, Inc. owned by Ramon "RJ" Jacinto. This station studios and transmitters are located at Shrine Hills, Matina, Davao City.

RJTV programs

Note: Two shows from RJTV continues airing (Thank God It's RJ Live! and RJ Sunday Jam) at 23:00 and 09:00 PHT respectively.

Stations

See also
 Rajah Broadcasting Network

References

External links
 Official Site

Television stations in Davao City
2nd Avenue (TV channel) stations
Television channels and stations established in 1994